European route E 314 (E 314) is a west–east European route, running from Leuven in Belgium, through the Netherlands, to Aachen in Germany.

The highway is maintained by Rijkswaterstaat.

Route description

History

Exit list

See also

References

External links

314
Motorways in Limburg (Netherlands)
South Limburg (Netherlands)